KSEQ is a commercial radio station located in Fresno, California, broadcasting to the Fresno, California and Visalia, California, areas on 97.1 FM. KSEQ airs a rhythmic Top 40 music format branded as Q97-1 (pronounced "Q-Ninety Seven One").  Its studios are located just north of downtown Fresno in the Tower District, and the transmitter tower is on Eshom Point.

History
KSEQ dropped their adult contemporary music format in favor of a Top 40 music format in 1997, only to evolve to Rhythmic Top 40 in 1998.

KSEQ broadcasts out of downtown Fresno, CA and has dominated the Fresno, CA Market for over a decade. KSEQ's main competitor is KBOS, which has been the heritage CHR station in the market for almost 30 years.

Musically, KSEQ has always shifted and capitalized on the current state of the CHR format each year. In January 2009, KSEQ began heavily separating itself from KBOS with artists like Lady Gaga, Black Eyed Peas, Beyoncé, and Mariah Carey. This musical shift has helped KSEQ maintain its competitive edge and has also been more 'client friendly' in the market.

In May 2012, KSEQ/Q97.1 welcomed Big Boy's Neighborhood to the morning show and added market veteran Erik "Danny" Salas to the Afternoon Drive.

On September 9, 2013, KSEQ/Q97.1 welcomed former program director for KBOS Greg Hoffman and Comedian Andre Covington (also formerly of KBOS) to the morning show time slot that replaced Big Boy's Neighborhood. The morning show is called the "Greg and Dre Morning Show".

On March 10, 2014, Buckley Broadcasting announced that it would sell KSEQ to Lotus Communications. The transaction, at a purchase price of $2.4 million, was consummated on July 11, 2014.

In December 2014, KSEQ/Q97.1 welcomed DJ Erb, a 12-year veteran at KBOS, who now mixes the Drive at 5 Mix and is the current Music/Imaging Director.

References

External links
Official Website

SEQ
Rhythmic contemporary radio stations in the United States
Radio stations established in 1984
Lotus Communications stations